The 2021 Humpty's Champions Cup, a curling Grand Slam event, was held April 15–19, 2021 at the Markin MacPhail Centre at Canada Olympic Park in Calgary, Alberta. Two days before the event was supposed to begin on Monday, April 12, the organizers delayed its start time by one day due to the (false) positive COVID-19 tests from the 2021 World Men's Curling Championship, which was held at the same site from April 2–11.

Due to the COVID-19 pandemic in Canada, it was announced that both the Champions Cup and the Players' Championship Grand Slam of Curling events would still be held in the 2020–21 curling season but would move to a centralized "bubble" (similar to that of the NHL as in Edmonton) at Canada Olympic Park alongside Curling Canada's national championships. All events will be held behind closed doors with no spectators. Due to the pandemic, it is the first Grand Slam event to be held since the 2020 Canadian Open held in January 2020. 

The event utilized the "no tick rule", an experimental rule in which any guard rock touching the centre line may not be moved off of the centre line by an opposing stone until the sixth rock of the end.

On the men's side, Bruce Mouat of Scotland won his second career Grand Slam by defeating Team Brendan Bottcher 6–3 in the final. Mouat previously won the 2017 Boost National.

On the women's side, Rachel Homan of Ottawa also won 6–3 in the final, doubling up on Team Silvana Tirinzoni of Switzerland. It was Homan's eleventh Grand Slam title.

Qualification
The top 12 ranked men's and women's teams on the World Curling Federation's world team rankings qualified for the event. In the event that a team declines their invitation, the next-ranked team on the world team ranking is invited until the field is complete.

Men
Top world team ranking men's teams:
 Brad Jacobs
 John Epping
 Brad Gushue
 Brendan Bottcher
 Bruce Mouat
 Yannick Schwaller
 Mike McEwen
 Niklas Edin
 Peter de Cruz
 Kevin Koe
 Matt Dunstone
 Ross Paterson
 Jason Gunnlaugson

Women
Top world team ranking women's teams:
 Anna Hasselborg
 Kerri Einarson
 Tracy Fleury
 Satsuki Fujisawa
 Jennifer Jones
 Elena Stern
 Silvana Tirinzoni
 Rachel Homan
 Eve Muirhead
 Tabitha Peterson
 Kim Min-ji
 Alina Kovaleva

Format
The 12 qualifying teams were divided into two pools of 6. Each team plays four games against teams in their pool. The top six teams overall make the playoffs.

Men

Teams

The teams are listed as follows:

Round-robin standings
Final round-robin standings

Round-robin results
All draw times are listed in Mountain Daylight Time (UTC−06:00).

Draw 1
Thursday, April 15, 8:00 am

Draw 2
Thursday, April 15, 12:00 pm

Draw 3
Thursday, April 15, 4:00 pm

Draw 4
Thursday, April 15, 8:00 pm

Draw 5
Friday, April 16, 8:00 am

Draw 6
Friday, April 16, 12:00 pm

Draw 7
Friday, April 16, 4:00 pm

Draw 8
Friday, April 16, 8:00 pm

Draw 9
Saturday, April 17, 8:00 am

Draw 10
Saturday, April 17, 12:00 pm

Draw 12
Saturday, April 17, 8:00 pm

Tiebreaker
Sunday, April 18, 12:00 pm

Playoffs

Quarterfinals
Sunday, April 18, 4:00 pm

Semifinals
Sunday, April 18, 8:00 pm

Final
Monday, April 19, 12:00 pm

Women

Teams

The teams are listed as follows:

Round-robin standings
Final round-robin standings

Round-robin results
All draw times are listed in Mountain Daylight Time (UTC−06:00).

Draw 1
Thursday, April 15, 8:00 am

Draw 2
Thursday, April 15, 12:00 pm

Draw 3
Thursday, April 15, 4:00 pm

Draw 4
Thursday, April 15, 8:00 pm

Draw 5
Friday, April 16, 8:00 am

Draw 6
Friday, April 16, 12:00 pm

Draw 8
Friday, April 16, 8:00 pm

Draw 9
Saturday, April 17, 8:00 am

Draw 10
Saturday, April 17, 12:00 pm

Draw 11
Saturday, April 17, 4:00 pm

Tiebreakers
Sunday, April 18, 12:00 pm

Playoffs

Quarterfinals
Sunday, April 18, 4:00 pm

Semifinals
Sunday, April 18, 8:00 pm

Final
Monday, April 19, 4:00 pm

Notes

References

External links

Champions Cup (curling)
Players' Championship
Players' Championship
Curling competitions in Calgary
Champions Cup